Hela Apparel Holdings PLC branded as Hela Clothing is a holding company in Sri Lanka that is engaged in the apparel industry. The company supplies to a number of brands such as Tommy Hilfiger, Calvin Klein, and Michael Kors. Hela Apparel Holdings operate four design centres in Sri Lanka, the United States, France and the United Kingdom. The company have eleven manufacturing plants, seven in Sri Lanka, and two each in Ethiopia and Kenya. The company is one constituent of the S&P Sri Lanka 20 Index since June 2022.

History
Hela Clothing (Pvt) Ltd was incorporated in 1991. The Fielding Group was the initial owner of the company. British entrepreneur Dominic McVey invested in Hela Clothing in 2013. Sri Lankan business executive Dian Gomes was hired by McVey to lead the company. In 2016, the company set a target of double the revenue to USD300 million by 2020. The company wanted to emulate the success of MAS Holdings and Brandix but planned to grow faster. By 2017, the plan was faltering as the company was incurring sizeable overheads and facing cash flow constraints. The company was forced to expand into Ethiopia and Kenya. Gomes wanted to raise capital by either infusing capital from existing shareholders or diluting 30% of ownership to raise USD10 million from outside investors. Gomes's relationship with McVey was strained when Gomes wanted to suspend the annual management fee of USD one million to the investment firm Ellestone Apparel, a company headed by McVey. In 2019, Gomes resigned from the company and  McVey divested significantly his stake. An investor consortium infused USD10 million into the company's capital in November 2018. 

Hela Clothing appointed A. R. Rasiah as the new chairman of the company in December 2018. Hela Apparel Holdings (Pvt) Ltd was founded in 2018 and was listed on the Colombo Stock Exchange in 2022. The company went through an initial public offering (IPO) as the means of listing on the stock exchange. The IPO was intended to offer 20% of the stake of the company and raise the capital of LKR4 billion. The IPO received applications for a value of over LKR4 billion on the first day itself. The IPO was the largest issue since 2011 and had to close on the same day. The IPO was oversubscribed 5.4 times and received applications worth LKR21.8 billion.

Operations
The company received a credit rating of AA(lka) from Fitch Ratings in March 2022 and the outlook is adjudged as stable. Hela Apparel Holdings expanded into Egypt by launching its twelfth plant in the country. Egypt was chosen due to the advantages of being located proximately to Europe and North America, thus reducing shipping times. The company recorded a 75% revenue growth in the financial year 2021/22. The revenue for the period was LKR56 billion. In 2022, the company has been awarded the ISO 14064-1:2018
certification by the Sustainable Future Group. The certification was awarded to Hela Apparel Holdings for establishing a framework to report and quantify greenhouse gas emissions. It also involves implementing a Carbon Management Plan for reducing emissions.

See also
 List of companies listed on the Colombo Stock Exchange

References

External links
 Official website

2018 establishments in Sri Lanka
Companies listed on the Colombo Stock Exchange
Clothing companies established in 2018
Holding companies of Sri Lanka
Clothing companies of Sri Lanka
Clothing brands of Sri Lanka